is a Japanese science fiction comedy anime series produced by Jiho Eigasha. Its 260 episodes were aired from April 1, 1974 to March 21, 1975, at a length of around five minutes each, each containing two shorts of at least two minutes in length.

Plot
The titular character, Poron, comes from outerspace to Earth. There, he soon encounters the native life-forms, although as a new arrival, he is unaware that he has ignored humans and instead befriends several animals. The mischievous animal folks, however, keep causing trouble in various places, by their naughty antics and bad behaviors. Poron, though exasperated, secretly unleashes his mysterious power, to save and punish them.

Characters

An extraterrestrial boy with an antenna growing out of his bald head. He has ability to fly. By emitting light from the stars on the headband he is wearing, he floats objects and changes matters, and settle the problems. He watches over the animal kids, and whenever he sees a young one acting in an unruly manner or in trouble, rushes to the scene. He punishes them and teaches them what they shouldn't do. To accomplish these tasks, he is usually rather ruthless, so the means of his punishment are often quite severe. He loves bananas. There are some episodes where he doesn't intervene, but makes an appearance to utter a few words on the moral of the episode.

The animal kids who are the cause of all the troubles and turmoil. They get either saved or punished by Poron.

Besides explaining the plot and current situations to the audience, lectures the animal folks now and then.

Staff
Writers: Tetsuyoshi Ônuki, Setsuko Murayama
Character Design: Tōki Kuwashima
Key Animation: Takao Suzuki
Animation: Sumio Iwasaki, Tetsuyoshi Chyōshi, Fumio Sakai, Atsuko Nakajima
Camera: Masayuki Hattori
Animation Production: Nihon Doga
Produced by Jiho Eigasha

Cult status
The series has become a popular internet meme due to non-existent plots, poorly drawn characters, and limited animation which have led to dozens of video remixes and MADs.

See also
Gan to Gon
Chargeman Ken!

References

External links

1974 anime television series debuts
1975 Japanese television series endings
Science fiction anime and manga
Comedy anime and manga
Extraterrestrials in anime and manga